Zoroastrian Dari ( literally Behdīnān dialect) is a Persian dialect and a Northwestern Iranian ethnolect. 

Zoroastrian Dari used to be spoken by almost a million people in central Iran, up until the 1880s. Nowadays, it is used as a first language by an estimated 8,000 to 15,000 Zoroastrians in and around the cities of Yazd and Kerman in central Iran, and by the Irani community in India.

Dari is also known as Behdināni or pejoratively as Gabri (sometimes Gavrŭni or Gabrōni). Dari has numerous dialects.

Genealogy
Genealogically, Dari Persian is a member of the Northwestern Iranian language subfamily, which includes several other closely related languages, for instance, Kurdish,  Zazaki, and Balochi. These Northwestern Iranian languages are a branch of the larger Western Iranian language group, which is, in turn, a subgroup of the Iranian language family.

Name
The language known as Zoroastrian Dari is also referred to as 'Behdinâni' ("language of the people of good religion") or pejorative yet common name, 'Gabri' ("language of the infidels"). The roots of the name 'Gabri' date back to the Muslim invasion of Iran and are resented by indigenous speakers of Dari to refer to their language. As Farudi and Toosarvandani point out: "For them, choosing to call their language Dari, the speakers of the language invoke their ancestral connections to a pre-Islamic Iran."

Dialects

According to Farudi and Toosarvaredani, Dari is traditionally divided into two main dialects: the variety spoken in Yazd and the one spoken in Kerman. However, this division of the language conceals the complexity of the actual dialectical situation. The Yazdi dialect has approximately thirty varieties, each distinct and unique to one of the Zoroastrian neighborhoods in and around Yazd. Were it not for the geographic proximity of the Yazdi dialects, they would be classified as distinct dialects. The Kermani dialect may also contain (or may have contained at one time) a comparable level of dialectical complexity.

Endangered status

Although Dari has been generally considered quintessential to Zoroastrian identity, but its vitality of it is being affected or has been affected in the past, by two main types of pressure: economic and political.

The pressures affecting the vitality of Dari Persian today are largely economic. In order to obtain an economic advantage, speakers are giving up their traditional language for the dominant language of Iran, standard new Persian. Parents intentionally do not transmit Dari to their children in order that they may have what is felt to be an advantage in school and in life. The language loss can also occur more indirectly and less visible when people move to larger urban centers or abroad in pursuit of better economic opportunities; the lack of a complete language environment in which to immerse a child decreases or completely inhibits the transmission of the language to new generations.

In past times, Dari speakers experienced political pressures to yield up their language as well. The period since the seventh-century Muslim conquest of Persia has been a time of great persecution for the Zoroastrians of Iran. Political pressures have directly resulted in language loss when Zoroastrians have deliberately abandoned their language as a means of hiding their identity so as to escape persecution. Political pressures have also led to language loss indirectly; the oppression the Zoroastrians have been experienced under Iran’s various rulers over the past thousand or so years has driven a steady stream of Zoroastrians to more tolerant areas, mostly the capital, Tehran, or abroad. Again, a complete language environment does not exist in these places, inhibiting the transmission of Dari to new generations.

Linguists currently consider Dari to be in a state of language shift. Many of the language’s speakers have assimilated to the dominant culture of the society they live in and have given up—intentionally or unintentionally—their traditional language. Languages like Dari are transferring from a state of language maintenance, in which a language is being sustained in the face of pressure from a dominant culture, to language death, a state in which the language is no longer spoken.

Many of Dari’s dialects are facing extinction at an even more rapid pace than the language as a whole. Since each of Dari’s many dialects has a smaller community of speakers, they are more susceptible to the forces driving the language towards extinction. Some dialects have already effectively reached extinction, for example, the Mohammadabad dialect, which, it is reported, possesses only a few speakers living in Tehran. The Kerman dialect, always susceptible because of the smaller size of its Zoroastrian population, also seems to be largely lost.

See also
 Zoroastrians in Iran

References

Bibliography

Further reading

 
 
 

Languages of Iran
Northwestern Iranian languages
Zoroastrianism in Iran